Joseph L. Taylor (born August 27, 1939) is a former American football cornerback who played his entire eight-year National Football League career with the Chicago Bears.

External links
NFL.com player page

1939 births
American football cornerbacks
North Carolina A&T Aggies football players
Chicago Bears players
Players of American football from Florida
American people who self-identify as being of Native American descent
African-American players of American football
Lumbee people
Living people
21st-century African-American people
20th-century African-American sportspeople